Polymixis xanthomista, the black-banded polymixis, is a moth of the family Noctuidae. The species was first described by Jacob Hübner in 1819. It is found in western Europe, southern Europe and east to Romania, Hungary and Slovenia and also in North Africa. In the Alps it can be found at up to 2000 metres above sea level.

Technical description and variation

Forewing greyish white, thickly dusted with blackish grey, the median area filled up with blackish; the edges of the lines and stigmata and the course of vein 1 picked out with yellow scales; the upper stigmata large and paler, the orbicular with a dark dot in middle; submarginal line preceded by wedge-shaped black marks; hindwing of male white, with the veins blackish and sometimes a slight grey submarginal band before the blackish marginal line; of female uniform dark grey; — nigrocincta Tr. , the more common form, is blacker, with the yellow scales more or less obsolete; – nivescens Stgr. from the chalk district of the Jura, Switzerland, has the ground colour of the basal and marginal areas much whiter; — statices Gregs. is a dark smaller race from the Isle of Man; its main difference is that the inner and outer lines edging the blackish median area are more distinctly and broadly white, especially below the middle; the amount of yellow scaling is variable.

Biology
Adults are on wing from the end of August to mid-October.

Larva reddish brown, thickly speckled with tiny dark dots, which form a dorsal and two broader subdorsal.
The larvae feed on various plants, including Plantago, Taraxacum, Verbascum, Rumex, Lonicera and Prunus padus. Subspecies statices has been recorded on various low growing plants, including Armeria maritima and seems to prefer the flowers.

Subspecies
Polymixis xanthomista xanthomista (North Africa through western southern Europe, east to Romania, Hungary and Slovenia)
Polymixis xanthomista statices Gregson, 1869 (Great Britain)
Polymixis xanthomista lutea Schwingenschuss, 1963 (Morocco)
Polymixis xanthomista hadenina Rungs, 1972 (Morocco)
Polymixis xanthomista rmadia Rungs, 1967 (Morocco)
Polymixis xanthomista meftouha Rungs, 1967 (Morocco)
Polymixis xanthomista chehebia Rungs, 1972 (Morocco)

References

External links

 Taxonomy
Fauna Europaea
Lepiforum e.V.
Schmetterlinge-Deutschlands.de

Cuculliinae
Moths described in 1819
Moths of Africa
Moths of Europe
Taxa named by Jacob Hübner